The 2011 Malaysia FA Cup, also known as the Astro Piala FA due to the competition's sponsorship by Astro Arena, was the 22nd season of the Malaysia FA Cup, a knockout competition for Malaysia's state football association and clubs.

Negeri Sembilan FA were the defending champions.

The cup winner were guaranteed a place in the 2012 AFC Cup.

Format
The Piala FA competition has reverted to the old format of play with no more open draws. It will be involve 30 teams — 16 Super League and 14 Premier League sides — with defending league champions Selangor FA, defending cup winners Negeri Sembilan FA and runner's up Kedah FA receiving byes in the first round.

For the 2011 year edition, In the first round and the second league will only play one legged match instead playing a two legged match unlike the previous edition.

The winner of the 2011 edition will qualify to the 2012 AFC Cup.

Piala FA Matches

First round

Second round

Quarter-finals
The first leg matches will be played on 9 March 2010, with the second legs to be held on 20 March 2010.

|}

Semi-finals
The first leg matches will be played on 30 March 2010, with the second legs to be held on 3 April 2010.

|}

Final
The final was played at National Stadium, Bukit Jalil, Kuala Lumpur, on Saturday, 11 June 2011.

Winners

References

External links
 Football Association Malaysia

 
Piala FA
2011 domestic association football cups